Interferon-alpha/beta receptor alpha chain is a protein that in humans is encoded by the IFNAR1 gene.

Function 

The protein encoded by this gene is a type I membrane protein that forms one of the two chains of a receptor for type I interferons, including interferon-alpha, -beta, and -lambda. Binding and activation of the receptor stimulates Janus protein kinases, which in turn phosphorylate several proteins, including STAT1 and STAT2. The encoded protein also functions as an antiviral factor.

Interactions 

IFNAR1 has been shown to interact with:
 PRMT1,
 STAT2,  and
 Tyrosine kinase 2.

References

Further reading